Anubias barteri var. angustifolia was first described by Adolf Engler in 1915 as A. lanceolata f. angustifolia. The species obtained varietal status within A. barteri in 1979.

Synonyms
Anubias lanceolata f. angustifolia Engler.

Distribution
West Africa: Guinea, Liberia, Ivory Coast, Cameroon.

Description
This plant's long-stemmed dark green leave blades are 5-9 times as long as wide (up to 3.5 cm) and 8–15 cm long. The petioles are 4–33 cm long, from 0.5-1 times as long as the blade.

Cultivation
Like most Anubias species, this plant grows well partially and fully submersed and the rhizome must be above the substrate, attached to rocks or wood. It grows well in a range of lighting and prefers a temperature range of 22-28 degrees C. It can be propagated by dividing the rhizome or by separating side shoots.

References

barteri var. angustifolia
Aquatic plants
Flora of Cameroon
Plants described in 1915
Flora of Guinea
Flora of Liberia
Flora of Ivory Coast